is a private junior college in Chūō-ku, Chiba, Chiba Prefecture, Japan, established in 1970. The predecessor of the school, a women's college, was founded in 1925.

External links
 Official website 

Japanese junior colleges
Educational institutions established in 1925
Private universities and colleges in Japan
Universities and colleges in Chiba Prefecture
1925 establishments in Japan